Thomas Harold "Junior" Burrough (born January 18, 1973) is an American former professional basketball player.

A 6'8" power forward, Burrough played collegiately at the University of Virginia, and was selected by the Boston Celtics 33rd overall in the 1995 NBA Draft. His NBA career consisted of one season for the Celtics in 1995–96.  He is currently the Head Boys' Basketball Coach at Norfolk Collegiate in Norfolk, VA.

External links
College & NBA stats @ basketballreference.com
Junior Burrough head shot @ eurobasket.com

1973 births
Living people
African-American basketball players
American expatriate basketball people in South Korea
Anyang KGC players
Basketball players from Charlotte, North Carolina
Boston Celtics draft picks
Boston Celtics players
Maroussi B.C. players
Power forwards (basketball)
Richmond Rhythm players
Seoul SK Knights players
Virginia Cavaliers men's basketball players
American men's basketball players
Oak Hill Academy (Mouth of Wilson, Virginia) alumni
21st-century African-American sportspeople
20th-century African-American sportspeople